This is a list of people who have served as Custos Rotulorum of Warwickshire.

 Sir George Throckmorton bef. 1544–1552
 Sir Ambrose Cave bef. 1558–1568
 Robert Dudley, 1st Earl of Leicester bef. 1573–1588
 Sir Fulke Greville bef. 1594 – aft. 1596
 Sir Thomas Leigh bef. 1605–1626
 Fulke Greville, 1st Baron Brooke 1626–1628
 William Feilding, 1st Earl of Denbigh 1628–1643
 Francis Leigh, 1st Baron Dunsmore 1643–1646
 Interregnum
 Basil Feilding, 2nd Earl of Denbigh 1660–1675
 Edward Conway, 1st Earl of Conway 1675–1683
 Robert Spencer, 2nd Earl of Sunderland 1683–1689
 George Compton, 4th Earl of Northampton 1689–1719
 Thomas Parker, 1st Earl of Macclesfield 1719–1728
 John Montagu, 2nd Duke of Montagu 1728–1749
For later custodes rotulorum, see Lord Lieutenant of Warwickshire.

References

Institute of Historical Research - Custodes Rotulorum 1544-1646
Institute of Historical Research - Custodes Rotulorum 1660-1828

Warwickshire